Edjeleh is a village in the commune of In Amenas, in In Amenas District, Illizi Province, Algeria, located near the border with Libya. It is the site of a significant oil field.

References

Neighbouring towns and cities

Populated places in Illizi Province